This is a list of correctional workers in Canada who have died or been killed while in the performance of their duties.

Correctional Peace Officer  
Shayne Slade 
Grande Cache Institution
Prison in Grande Cache, Alberta
Took his own life from work issues 
Nov 27 2019

Margaret Mick 

Margaret Mick (1 June 1860 – 25 May 1925) was Canada's first female peace officer to be killed in the line of duty. On the night of Monday, May 25, 1925 Mick, who worked as a Matron, was the only staff member on duty at the Toronto Municipal Jail Farm for Women in Concord, Ontario. About 10:15 PM, one inmate was able to squeeze through the bars of her cell and free another. The two of them waited while a third complained about a leak in her cell. When Mick came to investigate she was jumped by the two lying in wait for her. She was beaten unconscious, and tied to pipes in a utility room. She was found dead the next morning still tied to the pipes.

Her three assailants were caught and convicted of their crime and each served five years in jail.

Mick was the first woman to be added to the memorial commemorating fallen police and peace officers near Parliament Hill in Ottawa, Ontario.

The Farm was located in Richmond Hill on the north side of Highway 7 from Yonge Street to Bayview Avenue. The facility opened in 1912, was closed in 1959 and demolished in 1981. The surrounding land is now mixed commercial and residential development with no traces of the former facility.

Anton Martinsen Fladeby 

Anton Fladeby came to Canada from Norway in the spring of 1909, a few of months prior to his 20th birthday and on December 1, 1914, at the age of 25, he enlisted as a guard at Manitoba Penitentiary (known today as the Stony Mountain Penitentiary). During World War I, he saw action overseas in France with the Canadian Army. In 1919, he returned to Canada and after a month of rest, returned to duty at Manitoba Penitentiary.

On Friday, May 2, 1919, ten days after his return to his work at the penitentiary, Fladeby was checking inmates in and out of the barbershop area when he encountered inmate Albert Johnson. Fladeby had recently searched Johnson’s cell and discovered a letter that the latter was writing, complaining about the ill treatment of inmates at Manitoba Penitentiary. Letters of this type were considered contraband at the time and Fladeby had confiscated it. Inmate Johnson now harboured strong resentment toward Fladeby.

Inmate Johnson lunged at Fladeby, stabbing him in the neck with a small knife he had gotten from the infirmary to "cut his fingernails", severing the artery on the right side. Two other inmates came to the aid of Fladeby and administered first aid until the arrival of the penitentiary doctor. Fladeby seemed to be resuscitating and was taken to the Winnipeg General Hospital. However, on Sunday, May 11, 1919, Anton Fladeby succumbed to his wounds.  He was buried with full military honours in the "Field of Honour" at Brookside Cemetery in Winnipeg.

Albert Johnson was found guilty of manslaughter and received a life sentence, of which he served 16 years until his deportation to the United States.

John Williams 

John Williams, a veteran of both the Boer War and World War I, became a guard with the Canadian Penitentiary Service on March 11, 1920. In the mid-1920s construction of a new sewage treatment plant began at the Stony Mountain Penitentiary (then called the Manitoba Penitentiary). On June 26, Williams was supervising an inmate work-gang blasting rock when a laid charge failed to detonate. Williams allowed an "inordinate amount of time" to pass before he removed the inmates to a safe area and investigated. Just as Williams reached the charge it detonated, killing him instantly.

Williams was buried with full military honours in the "Field of Honour" at Brookside Cemetery in Winnipeg. He was survived by his wife and four children.

Kearwood "Kip" White 
Guard Kip White, a turnkey at the Huron County Gaol, was murdered in December, 1941. White was struck on the head with a hammer by an escaping inmate on 14 December, but did not immediately die. Shortly after, an x-ray showed that an abscess had formed on his brain, and on Christmas Day, White died on the operating table.

Robert Henry Canning 

Robert Canning, a veteran of World War I, began working at the Toronto (Don) Jail on April 1, 1944 after being honourably discharged from the Veterans' Guard in March. On June 10, 1944, Canning was assigned to the jail infirmary, which at the time housed eight inmates, many of which were mentally disturbed and restrained in their beds. Two of the inmates not restrained were awaiting transfer to the Kingston Penitentiary, one to serve a four-year sentence and the other nineteen years.

At about 10:00 PM the two inmates jumped Canning and beat and strangled him to death. Another guard was supposed to check on Canning during his patrols, but failed to do so. A bloody trail around the infirmary indicated that Canning did not succumb without a fight. His body was found later, tied to a pipe near the window through which the inmates escaped.

The escape was only partially successful. When the first inmate lowered himself from the window, the makeshift rope broke preventing the second inmate from following.  The first inmate was recaptured shortly after. Both were convicted of manslaughter and sentenced to an additional 25 years for one and 10 years for the other.

Diane Lavigne and Pierre Rondeau 

Two of the most notorious deaths of correctional officers in Canada were the assassinations of Diane Lavigne and Pierre Rondeau ordered by members of the Hells Angels motorcycle gang in Quebec. Lavigne was shot on June 26, 1997 from a passing motorcycle as she drove home from work. Rondeau and his partner Robert Corriveau were ambushed on September 8, 1997 as they drove an empty prison bus to pick up inmates. Corriveau suffered major injuries but ultimately survived after being left for dead. 

Stéphane Gagné, a former Hells Angels who turned informant after being identified as having participated in the two murders, testified that the officers were selected at random as part of a broader plan to destabilize the justice system in Quebec.

In May 2002, Maurice (Mom) Boucher, one of the leaders of the Hells Angels in Quebec, was convicted for having ordered the killings.

See also
The Officer Down Memorial Page

References

External links
Canadian Corrections Fallen Officers
The Canadian Peace Officers' Memorial Association

Penal system in Canada